WUAT is a Variety formatted broadcast radio station licensed to Pikeville, Tennessee, serving Pikeville and Bledsoe County, Tennessee. WUAT is owned and operated by Vicki R. Smith and Johnny William Paul Bridges, through licensee WUAT, LLC.

History
In 1995, Dr. Charles Bownds and his wife Joyce, originally from Houston, Texas, purchased WUAT.

The station's studios are within the Mini-Outlet store, also owned by the Bownds, along Main Street in Pikeville. Joyce Bownds, who was also the station's morning disc jockey, died on January 31, 2016. On March 18, 2016, ownership of the station was transferred to the Estate of Joyce Virginia Bownds, with her husband Dr. Charles P. Bownds as the executor.

The Estate of Joyce Virginia Bownds entered into an agreement with Vicki R. Smith and Johhny William Paul Bridges, both of Pikeville, on August 24, 2016. The sale to Smith and Bridges' WUAT, LLC, at a price of $20,000, was consummated on October 17, 2016.

References

External links
 WUAT Radio on Facebook
 

1972 establishments in Tennessee
Variety radio stations in the United States
Radio stations established in 1972
UAT
Bledsoe County, Tennessee
UAT